Odobești is a town in Vrancea County, Western Moldavia, Romania. The town administers one village, Unirea.

Natives
 Ioana Badea
 Mara Đorđević

See also
The Royal Cellar

References

Towns in Romania
Populated places in Vrancea County
Localities in Western Moldavia